Bavarian is the adjective form of the German state of Bavaria, and refers to people of ancestry from Bavaria.

Bavarian may also refer to:
 Bavarii, a Germanic tribe
 Bavarians, a nation and ethnographic group of Germans
 Bavarian, Iran, a village in Fars Province
 Bavarian language, a West Germanic language

See also 
 
 Bavaria (disambiguation)

Language and nationality disambiguation pages